Semei Kakungulu (1869 – 24 November 1928) was a Ugandan statesman who founded the Abayudaya (Luganda: Jews) community in Uganda in 1917. He studied and meditated on the Old Testament, adopted the observance of all Moses' commandments, including circumcision, and suggested this observance for all his followers. The Abayudaya follow Jewish practices and consider themselves Jews despite the absence of Israelite ancestry.

He was also chosen to be the president of the Lukiiko of Busoga by the British colonists, and in effect, he became Busoga’s first 'King', although the British refused to give him that title. However, conflicts amongst the different chiefs and clans continued, and most Basoga still retained affiliation to their chief, clan or dialect. The Lukiiko structure collapsed, and Kakungulu was dismissed by the British.

Early life
Kakungulu was a warrior and statesman of the powerful Baganda tribe. During the 1880s he was converted to Christianity by a Protestant missionary who taught him how to read the Bible in Swahili. Because he commanded many warriors, because of his connections to the Bugandan court and because he was a Protestant, the British sought Kakungulu's  support in imposing their imperial rule in eastern Uganda. He responded by conquering and bringing under the British sphere of influence two areas outside of the Bugandan Empire, Bukedi and Busoga. These areas were between the Nile River's source in Lake Victoria and Mt. Elgon on the Kenyan border.

Kakungulu believed that the British would allow him to become the king of Bukedi and Busoga, but the British preferred to rule these areas through civil servants in their pay and under their control. The British limited Kakungulu to a  area in and around what has now become Mbale, Uganda. The people who inhabited this area were of the Bagisu tribe rivals to Baganda. Nevertheless, Kakungulu, with the help of his Baganda followers, although much reduced in numbers, was able to maintain control so long as he received British support.

Beginning in about 1900, a slow but continuous mutual disenchantment arose between Kakungulu and the British. In 1913, Kakungulu became a Malakite Christian. This was a movement described by the British as a "cult" which was "a mixture of Judaism, Christianity and Christian Science." Many who joined the religion of Malaki where Kakungulu was in control were Baganda.

While still a Malakite, Kakungulu came to the conclusion that the Christian missionaries were not reading the Bible correctly. He pointed out that the Europeans disregarded the real Sabbath, which was Saturday, not Sunday. As proof, he cited the fact that Jesus was buried on Friday before the Sabbath, and that his mother and his disciples did not visit the tomb on the following day because it was the Sabbath, but waited until Sunday.

Judaism
Under pressure from the British, who wished to limit his holdings, in 1917, Kakungulu moved his principal residence a short distance further from Mbale into the western foothills of Mt. Elgon to a place called Gangama. It was there that he started a separatist sect initially known as Kibiina Kya Bayudaya Absesiga Katonda (the Community of Jews who trust in the omnipotent God). Recruitment into this Bayudaya community came almost exclusively from what remained of Kakungulu's Baganda following.

The Bible, as a result of the teachings of the missionaries, was held in high regard among the Christians of Uganda. The missionaries had stressed the truth of the Bible by declaring that it came not from the Europeans but from an alien race, the Jews. The purpose of the missionaries was to impress upon the Africans that the Europeans too had found truth from a foreign race. But because of this emphasis, the customs and manners of the Jews became of great interest to Kakungulu's followers.

In 1922, at Gangama, Kakungulu published a 90-page book of rules and prayers as a guide for his Jewish community. The book set forth Jewish laws and practices as Kakungulu found them in the Old Testament, although it contained many verses and sections from the New Testament as well. Despite this interest in Jewish practices, there does not appear to have been any direct contact between Kakungulu and Jews before 1925.

Beginning in about 1925, several European Jews who were employed as mechanics and engineers by the British chanced upon the Christian-Jewish community near Mbale. Jews such as these, during what appear to have been chance encounters, told Kakungulu about Orthodox Judaism. As a result, many remaining Christian customs were dropped, including baptism. From these encounters, the community learned to keep the Sabbath, to recite Hebrew prayers and blessings, to slaughter animals for meat in a Kosher manner, and also to speak some Hebrew.

Death
Kakungulu died on 24 November 1928 of tetanus. After his death, the Abayudaya community divided into those wishing to retain a toehold within Christianity and those wanting to break those ties completely.  The Bayudaya "remained a mixture of both Christianity and Judaism, with faith in Christ remaining prominent in Kakungulu's beliefs."

Kakungulu is buried a short distance from the main Abayudaya synagogue behind the unpretentious home in which he lived during the last years of his life. The grave has a stone which reads:

“SEMEI WAKIRENZI KAKUNGULU 
A Victorious General and 
Sava Chief in Buganda 
Administrator of Eastern Province 1899-1905 
President of Busoga 1906-1913 
Died 24th 11 1928”

See also
 African Jews
 Beta Israel
 Ten Lost Tribes

References

External links 
 The genesis of the Abayudaya Community

1869 births
1928 deaths
Abayudaya
Ugandan monarchies
Converts to Judaism from Protestantism
Ugandan chiefs
Ugandan Jews
Black Jewish people
Deaths from tetanus